Series 1 of the ITV programme Foyle's War was first broadcast in 2002; comprising four episodes, it is set in Spring/Summer 1940.

Episodes

"The German Woman"

Background and Production
The episode is set very shortly after the German invasion of Norway and Denmark; Also, Squerryes Court, Westerham, Kent is used as the grand home of estate owner Henry Beaumont (Robert Hardy) and his family. Filmed: Summer 2001

"The White Feather"

Cast and Characters
Maggie Steed plays Margaret Ellis. This episode shows Milner starting back at work as a detective sergeant. He has recently acquired his artificial leg and still requires two crutches to aid him. His wife, Jane, expresses a great dislike for his prosthetic. Stewart tells Foyle that her father is a vicar; he appears in the episode "Eagle Day". Stewart is very pleased to be invited by Foyle to tea at the Crescent and eats more than her share of the food ordered, including the last lemon curd. Her interest in and healthy appetite for food appears in other episodes. Foyle receives a letter from his son Andrew (a voice-over by the uncredited Julian Ovenden), who writes about his pilot training in the Royal Air Force (RAF) and eating haggis (to hint at his location). "Woolton" is the name Robert Wolf assumes when staying at the White Feather. However, that is the name used in the credits for the character and his nephew Isaac, even though Isaac never used the pseudonym.

Background and Production
This episode is set in the days leading up to the Battle of Dunkirk. The characters discuss the fall of Brussels and the German advance. The characters attend church for a "National day of prayer" as the situation worsens. The episode ends with the Anglo-French evacuation of Dunkirk. One of the plot devices rests on a letter stolen from the Foreign Office; it purports to be from Lord Halifax, well known for his desire for appeasement or negotiated peace. The story also involves a (fictional) political organisation, the "Friday Club", which one of the characters likens to the (historical) British Union of Fascists. The arrest of the BUF leader Sir Oswald Mosley is also mentioned; this occurred in May 1940, when the BUF was banned. The fascists were known for their antisemitism and their political sympathy with Nazi Germany. The book which Spencer lends to Milner, The Protocols of the Elders of Zion, is a notorious antisemitic forgery. Filmed: April–May 2002

"A Lesson in Murder"

Cast and Characters
Milner is seen limping and uses one walking stick; it appears he is becoming accustomed to his false leg. However, his wife, Jane, continues to be upset by it. She leaves him, saying she is going to stay with her sister Kate in Wales. The episode reveals Foyle's long-standing friendship with Carlo Lucciano, a restaurant owner, which dates back to when Foyle's wife was alive. Foyle mentions that his son Andrew is undergoing pilot training with the RAF in Scotland. Tony Lucciano asks Stewart to be "his girl" and write to him while he is serving. She appears reluctant but finally agrees. There is no reference to Tony after this episode. The boy Joe (Greg Prentice) and his father Eric (Ian Puleston-Davies) are identified by the surname "Pearson" during the episode, but are credited as "Cooper".

Background and Production
The plot centres on an 11-year-old boy who was evacuated from London. In the months leading up to the war, 1.5 million people were moved: 827,000 children of school age; 524,000 mothers and young children (under five); 13,000 pregnant women; 7,000 disabled persons; and over 103,000 teachers and other "helpers". However, as a coastal town, Hastings was preparing for invasion, and in June 1940, vulnerable civilians were evacuated from southern and eastern coastal areas of Britain. At the end of the episode, it is heard that Italy has declared war on Britain and France, which occurred on 10 June 1940. Horsted Keynes railway station on the historic Bluebell Railway doubled for Hastings railway station. Filmed: May–June 2002

"Eagle Day"

Cast and Characters
Andrew Foyle is assigned duty flying low altitude missions in a brand-new Supermarine Spitfire, to help calibrate the new British technology of RDF (radar) and finds himself embroiled in the cover-up of a suicide scandal. During the investigation, it is revealed that Andrew became a nominal member of the British Communist Party in 1938, while attending Oxford, in reaction to the events of the Spanish Civil War. Milner now walks without the use of a cane, but still has a noticeable limp. It is revealed that Foyle's wife died "eight years ago", making her death sometime around 1932. He also speaks to his son about volunteering for service in the first war, becoming a private, serving in France for three years, being promoted, and that he had killed during combat.

Background and Production
Eagle Day, or Adlertag in German, refers to 13 August 1940, the first day of Unternehmen Adlerangriff ("Operation Eagle Attack"), when the Germans attacked radar stations in Britain. In this episode, it is represented when a bomb hits the radar station while Foyle was walking outside it.
The Supermarine Spitfire used in the episode is the 1943-built Spitfire LF Mk.IXb MH434, owned and operated by The Old Flying Machine Company. The scenes where Andrew Foyle flies under a bridge on his first 'mission' were reused from the 1988 TV series Piece of Cake (flown by Ray Hanna in MH434). Filmed: June–July 2002

International broadcast
The series was broadcast in the United States on PBS on Masterpiece Theatre on 2, 9, 16 and 23 February 2003 as Foyle's War I, and on Netflix as of April 2014.

References

External links 
 Series 1 on IMDb

Fiction set in 1940
Foyle's War episodes
2002 British television seasons